The Hunan Museum is the provincial museum of Hunan, China. It was built in 1951 and opened to the public in July 1956. It is located in the provincial capital Changsha at No. 50, Dongfeng Lu next to the Revolutionary Martyr's Park.

The museum has a collection of more than 180,000 objects, including items found in the tombs of the Marquis of Dai and his wife, Xin Zhui, in Mawangdui.

The museum was closed on 18 June 2012 for renovation and expansion works and reopened on 29 November 2017.

History
The Hunan Museum was first built in 1951 and opened to the public in July 1956.

On June 18, 2012, the museum closed its doors to the public due to reconstruction. China Central Academy of Fine Arts, assisted by Japanese architect Arata Isozaki, designed the present building. The construction began in 2012 and the museum was completed in 2017. The museum was reopened to the general public on November 29, 2017.

Gallery

See also
 List of museums in China

References

External links

Hunan Museum within Google Arts & Culture

Hunan Museum
Museums in Hunan
Museums established in 1956
1956 establishments in China
Buildings and structures in Changsha
Tourist attractions in Changsha
National first-grade museums of China